Charndej Weerapol (born 21 January 1944) is a Thai boxer. He competed in the men's bantamweight event at the 1972 Summer Olympics.

References

1944 births
Living people
Charndej Weerapol
Charndej Weerapol
Boxers at the 1972 Summer Olympics
Place of birth missing (living people)
Bantamweight boxers